A Machmeter is an aircraft pitot-static system flight instrument that
shows the ratio of the true airspeed to the speed of sound, 
a dimensionless quantity called Mach number.  This is shown on a Machmeter as a decimal fraction.
An aircraft flying at the speed of sound is flying
at a Mach number of one, expressed as Mach 1.

Use
As an aircraft in transonic flight approaches the speed of sound, 
it first reaches its critical mach number, where air flowing
over low-pressure areas of its surface locally reaches the
speed of sound, forming shock waves. The indicated airspeed
for this condition changes with ambient temperature, 
which in turn changes with altitude.
Therefore, indicated airspeed is not entirely adequate to
warn the pilot of the impending problems. Mach number is
more useful, and most high-speed aircraft are limited to a maximum operating Mach number, also known as MMO.

Operation
Modern electronic Machmeters use information from an air data computer system which makes calculations using inputs from a pitot-static system. Some older mechanical Machmeters use an altitude aneroid and an airspeed capsule which together convert pitot-static pressure into Mach number. The Machmeter suffers from instrument and position errors.

Calibration
In subsonic flow the Mach meter can be calibrated according to:

where:
 is Mach number
qc is impact pressure (dynamic pressure)
 is static pressure
and assuming the ratio of specific heats is 1.4

When a shock wave forms across the pitot tube the required formula is derived from the Rayleigh Supersonic Pitot equation, and is solved iteratively:

where:
 is now total pressure measured behind the normal shock.

Note that the inputs required are total pressure and static pressure. Air temperature input is not required.

See also
 ICAO recommendations on use of the International System of Units
 Airspeed indicator
 Mach number
 Pitot-static system

References

Aircraft instruments
Measuring instruments
Speed sensors